SM UB-81 was a German Type UB III submarine or U-boat in the German Imperial Navy during World War I. She was commissioned into the German Imperial Navy on 18 September 1917 as SM UB-81.

Construction

UB-81 was ordered by the GIN on 23 September 1916 and her keel was laid down on 5 January 1917. She was built by AG Weser of Bremen and following just under a year of construction, launched at Bremen on 4 August 1917. UB-81 was commissioned later that same year under the command of Reinhold Saltzwedel. Like all Type UB III submarines, UB-81 carried 10 torpedoes and was armed with a  deck gun. UB-81 had a displacement of  while surfaced and  when submerged. Her engines enabled her to travel at  when surfaced and  when submerged.

On the night of 30 November/1 December 1917 she torpedoed and sank the 3,218 ton British steamer Molesey 12 miles west-south-west of the Brighton Light Vessel.

Fate
UB-81 struck a mine on the night of 2 December 1917 in the English Channel to the southeast of the Isle of Wight off Dunnose Head. The crew of 34, commanded by Oberleutnant zur See Reinhold Saltzwedel, managed to raise the forward torpedo tubes above the surface and seven crewmen escaped before a collision occurred with a British patrol boat and she sank; another source claims that 35 men were aboard and that six survived. The survivors were rescued by a Royal Navy patrol boat. She now lies at  OSGB at a depth of 28 metres (92 feet). The wreck is designated as a controlled site under the Protection of Military Remains Act 1986 and therefore all diving on her is strictly prohibited.

Summary of raiding history

References

Notes

Citations

Bibliography 

 

German Type UB III submarines
U-boats commissioned in 1917
Maritime incidents in 1917
U-boats sunk in 1917
World War I submarines of Germany
World War I shipwrecks in the English Channel
Protected Wrecks of England
1917 ships
Ships built in Bremen (state)
U-boats sunk by British warships
U-boats sunk by mines
1917 in Germany
1917 in England